The 2019 Bay of Plenty local elections were part of the wider 2019 New Zealand local elections, to elect members to sub-national councils and boards. The Bay of Plenty elections cover one regional council (Bay of Plenty Regional Council), seven territorial authority (city and district) councils, two district health boards, and various local boards and licensing trusts.

Bay of Plenty Regional Council

Eastern Bay of Plenty General Constituency (2)
Both candidates were elected.

Kōhī Māori Constituency (1)

Mauāo Māori Constituency (1)

Ōkurei Māori Constituency (1)
The candidate was elected unopposed.

Rotorua General Constituency (2)

Tauranga General Constituency (5)
All candidates were elected.

Western Bay of Plenty General Constituency (2)

Kawerau District Council

Mayor (1)

Council At-Large (8)

Ōpōtiki District Council

Mayor (1)

Rotorua Lakes Council

Mayor (1)

Council At-Large (10)

Community boards

Rotorua Lakes Community Board (4)

Rotorua Rural Community Board (4)

Tauranga City Council

Mayor (1)

Western Bay of Plenty District Council

Mayor (1)

Council wards

Kaimai Ward (4)

Katikati-Waihi Beach Ward (3)

Maketu-Te Puke Ward (4)

Community boards

Katikati Community Board (4)

Maketu Community Board (4)

Omokoroa Community Board (4)

Te Puke Community Board (4)

Whakatāne District Council

Mayor (1)

References

Bay of Plenty